The Pentax smc DA 15mm F4 ED AL Limited is a wide-angle prime lens for Pentax K-mount, announced by Pentax on March 2, 2009. Along with Pentax's other DA Limited primes, it was replaced in 2013 with an HD-coated version with rounded aperture blades.

References
www.dpreview.com

External links

15
Camera lenses introduced in 2013